Mohammadabad (also Romanized as Moḩammadābād) is a village in Zagheh Rural District, Zagheh District, Khorramabad County, Lorestan Province, Iran. At the 2006 census, its population was 123, in 30 families.

References 

Towns and villages in Khorramabad County